Aznab (also Romanized as Aznāb and Eznāb; also known as Aznau, Aznow, and Az̄nū) is a village in Darsajin Rural District, in the Central District of Abhar County, Zanjan Province, Iran. At the 2006 census, its population was 137, in 58 families.

References 

Populated places in Abhar County